Epaenetus is a name that comes from Ancient Greek, meaning 'praised', and may refer to:

 Epaenetus of Argos, winner of the boys' stadion race in the 80 BC Olympics
 Epenetus of Carthage (died 64 AD), a saint in the Greek Orthodox and Roman Catholic Churches
 Epaenetus (633–632 BC), an Archon of Athens
 Epaenetus (2nd century BC), ambassador, with Apollodorus of Boeotia, from the Boeotians to the Messenians

See also
 Papilio epenetus, a species of swallowtail butterfly